Joel Barnet Steinberg (born May 25, 1941) is a disbarred New York City criminal defense attorney who attracted international media attention when he was accused of rape and murder and was convicted of manslaughter, in the November 1, 1987, beating and subsequent death of a six-year-old girl, Elizabeth ("Lisa"), whom he and his live-in partner Hedda Nussbaum had illegally adopted.

Early life
Joel Steinberg was raised in the Bronx and Yonkers, New York. After graduating from Fordham University in 1962, he attended New York University Law School, but was dropped in 1964 and joined the U.S. Air Force in the following year. Following his military career, he returned to law school and was admitted to the bar in New York. Due to the ongoing Vietnam War, lawyers whose studies were interrupted by conscription were exempted from the bar exam requirement, if they met certain requirements.

Background
Steinberg shared a Greenwich Village, Manhattan apartment at 14 West 10th St. with Lisa, Mitchell (a younger child also illegally adopted), and his live-in partner Hedda Nussbaum. Steinberg had reportedly been hired by a single mother named Michele Launders to locate a suitable adoptive family for Lisa, but he instead took the child home and raised her with Nussbaum. He never filed formal adoption papers and the child was not legally adopted.

Death of Lisa Steinberg

Steinberg was under the influence of crack cocaine when he hit Lisa on the head on November 1, 1987. After the attack, he left the apartment to party with friends; Nussbaum eventually dialed 9-1-1. After police arrived at the scene, Lisa was transported from the apartment to Saint Vincent's Hospital. The child remained in the hospital for three days and died after being removed from life support. In addition to Joel's deadly assault of Lisa, Mitchell and Nussbaum both showed signs of physical abuse at the hands of Steinberg, and Nussbaum's battered, unkempt appearance did much to fuel the media frenzy that accompanied the story of Lisa's death.

Legal proceedings
In exchange for testifying against Steinberg, Nussbaum was not prosecuted for events related to Lisa's death. Nussbaum was alone in the apartment with an unconscious and bleeding Lisa for over ten hours without seeking any medical attention for the girl. At Steinberg's twelve-week trial, his defense argued that Nussbaum's extensive injuries resulted from a consensual sadomasochistic relationship between the two defendants. Her attorneys claimed that Nussbaum's decision to stay with Steinberg even though she was a victim of domestic violence was a sign of battered woman syndrome.

In New York State at that time, first-degree murder applied only to those who killed police officers or had committed murder while already serving a sentence for a previous murder. The jury was unable to convict Steinberg on the more serious charge of second-degree murder, but it did convict him of the lesser charge of first-degree manslaughter. Judge Harold Rothwax then sentenced him to the maximum penalty then available for that charge 8 to 25 years in state prison.

On two occasions, Steinberg was denied discretionary parole, mainly because he never expressed remorse for the killing. However, on June 30, 2004, he was paroled under the state's "good time" law, which mandates release of inmates who exhibit good behavior while incarcerated after having served two-thirds or more of the maximum possible sentence. New York State has since increased this ratio to six-sevenths of the maximum term for persons convicted of violent felonies. Steinberg had spent most of his imprisonment at New York State's supermax prison, the Southport Correctional Facility, presumably to prevent him from being attacked by other inmates.

After his release, Steinberg moved to Harlem, where he took up work in the construction industry. As of 2006, he maintained his innocence. Mitchell was reunited with his biological mother, Nicole Bridget Smigiel.

Civil lawsuit
On January 16, 2007, the New York Supreme Court, Appellate Division (New York's intermediate appellate court) upheld a $15 million award against Steinberg to Michele Launders, Lisa's birth mother. In its opinion, the court rejected the position that Steinberg, acting as his own attorney, put forth:

[F]or Steinberg to dismiss the 8 to 10 hours preceding Lisa's death as "at most eight hours of pain and suffering" or as he alternatively states, a "quick loss of consciousness" (emphasis supplied), demonstrates that he is as devoid of any empathy or human emotion now as he was almost 20 years ago when he stood trial for Lisa's homicide. As any parent and, no doubt, most adults who have taken trips with young children can attest, the oft-heard question, "are we there yet?" is a clear illustration that, the more anticipated an event or destination so, seemingly slower the passage of time in a child's mind. For Lisa, lying on a bathroom floor, her body aching from bruises of "varying ages," her brain swelling from Joel Steinberg's "staggering blow," those 8 to 10 hours so cavalierly dismissed by Steinberg must have seemed like eternity as she waited and wondered when someone would come to comfort her and help make the pain go away.

See also
Child abuse
Domestic abuse
Death of Nathaniel Craver
Death of Hana Grace-Rose Williams
Death of Lydia Schatz
Murder of Victoria Climbié
Murder of Dennis Jurgens

References

Further reading
 

1941 births
21st-century American Jews
American people convicted of manslaughter
Child abuse resulting in death
Criminal defense lawyers
Disbarred American lawyers
Filicides in New York (state)
Fordham University alumni
Jewish American attorneys
Lawyers from New York City
Living people
Military personnel from New York City
New York University School of Law alumni
People from the Bronx
Prisoners and detainees of New York (state)
United States Air Force officers